PT Daya Labuhan Indah (DLI) is a company active in the palm oil business from 
Bilah Hilir, Labuhan Batu Regency, North Sumatra, Indonesia. 
It is a grower of palm fruits and has a mill and two estates in North Sumatra.
Wilmar owns 95% of PT Daya Labuhan Indah.
There was evidence of hazardous work of children working on plantations of Daya Labuhan Indah and of failure to pay workers a daily minimum wage if they do not meet targets set by the company or if it rains at a certain time of day. 
According to the company, there is no child/underage labor and targets are based on calibration.
It also says, there is no forced labor.
PT Daya Labuhan Indah is certified by the Roundtable on Sustainable Palm Oil (RSPO).

References

North Sumatra
Palm oil companies of Indonesia